David Alejandro Salazar Zepeda (born August 5, 1991, in Monterrey, Nuevo León), known as David Salazar, is a Mexican professional footballer who plays for Atlante on loan from América.

External links
 

Living people
1991 births
Sportspeople from Monterrey
Liga MX players
Association football midfielders
Chiapas F.C. footballers
Atlante F.C. footballers
Lobos BUAP footballers
Potros UAEM footballers
Real Cuautitlán footballers
Ascenso MX players
Liga Premier de México players
Tercera División de México players
Footballers from Nuevo León
Mexican footballers